Adumanu is a mining community near Obuasi in the Ashanti Region of Ghana.

References 

Ashanti Region
Communities in Ghana